The 2017 Kansas Lottery 300 was the 30th stock car race of the 2017 NASCAR Xfinity Series season, the first race of the Round of 8, and the 17th iteration of the event. The race was held on Saturday, October 21, 2017, in Kansas City, Kansas at Kansas Speedway, a 1.500 miles (2.414 km) permanent paved oval-shaped racetrack. The race took the scheduled 200 laps to complete. In a wild finish, Christopher Bell, driving for Joe Gibbs Racing, would manage to defend against the dominant Erik Jones to win his first career NASCAR Xfinity Series victory and his only victory of the season. To fill out the podium, Tyler Reddick, driving for Chip Ganassi Racing, and Ryan Blaney, driving for Team Penske, would finish second and third, respectively.

Background 

Kansas Speedway is a 1.5-mile (2.4 km) tri-oval race track in Kansas City, Kansas. It was built in 2001 and hosts two annual NASCAR race weekends. The NTT IndyCar Series also raced there until 2011. The speedway is owned and operated by the International Speedway Corporation.

Entry list 

 (R) denotes rookie driver.
 (i) denotes driver who is ineligible for series driver points.

Practice

First practice 
The first practice session was held on Friday, October 20, at 1:30 PM CST. The session would last for 55 minutes.

Second and final practice 
The final practice session, sometimes known as Happy Hour, was held on Friday, October 20, at 4:00 PM CST. The session would last for 55 minutes.

Qualifying 
Qualifying was held on Saturday, October 21, at 11:05 AM CST. Since Kansas Speedway is under 2 miles (3.2 km) in length, the qualifying system was a multi-car system that included three rounds. The first round was 15 minutes, where every driver would be able to set a lap within the 15 minutes. Then, the second round would consist of the fastest 24 cars in Round 1, and drivers would have 10 minutes to set a lap. Round 3 consisted of the fastest 12 drivers from Round 2, and the drivers would have 5 minutes to set a time. Whoever was fastest in Round 3 would win the pole.

Mike Harmon was the only driver to fail to qualify.

Full qualifying results

Race results 
Stage 1 Laps: 45

Stage 2 Laps: 45

Stage 3 Laps: 110

Standings after the race 

Drivers' Championship standings

Note: Only the first 12 positions are included for the driver standings.

References 

2017 NASCAR Xfinity Series
NASCAR races at Kansas Speedway
October 2017 sports events in the United States
2017 in sports in Kansas